Victoria Wood's All Day Breakfast is a 50-minute television comedy special, written by and starring comedian Victoria Wood. It was broadcast on BBC One on Christmas Day 1992.

The show was largely a parody of British daytime TV. The sketches were linked by Duncan Preston and Wood as husband-and-wife presenters Martin Cumbernauld and Sally Crossthwaite, parodying the real husband-and-wife presenting team Richard Madeley and Judy Finnigan and their daytime magazine show, This Morning. Wood found the pair "unintentionally funny" and was particularly amused by the prospect of "sitting next to your husband and having to be nice to him". She claimed that Madeley and Finnigan had told her they loved the parody.

Cast
Victoria Wood – Herself / Sally Crossthwaite / Various characters
Julie Walters – Various characters
Celia Imrie – Various characters
Susie Blake – Various characters
Duncan Preston – Martin Cumbernauld / Various characters
Lill Roughley – Various characters
Geraldine Alexander – Mrs Beech (Patient's wife)
Shirley Cain – Nurse
Richard Lintern – Sean
Philip Lowrie – Various characters
William Osborne – Pierre
Sara Powell – Medical secretary
Nicholas Pritchard – Mr Beech (Patient)
Gillian Tompkins – Jackie
Alan Rickman – Himself

References

External links
BBC Comedy Guide on Victoria Wood's All Day Breakfast
IMDB entry

1992 television specials
British television films
BBC television sketch shows
Television shows written by Victoria Wood